When Knights Were Cold is a 1923 American comedy film directed by Frank Fouce starring Stan Laurel.

Cast
 Stan Laurel as Lord Helpus, a Slippery Knight
 Mae Laurel as Countess Out, a Classy Eve
 Catherine Bennett as Princess Elizabeth New Jersey, a Swell Eve
 Scotty MacGregor as Sir Chief Raspberry, a Rough Knight
 Billy Armstrong as Earl of Tabasco, a Hot Knight (credited as William Armstrong)
 Will Bovis as Duke of Sirloin, a Tough Knight
 Stanhope Wheatcroft as Prince of Pluto, a Bad Knight
 Harry De More as King Epsom, a Good Knight
 Dot Farley (uncredited)

See also
 List of American films of 1923

References

External links

1923 films
American silent short films
American black-and-white films
1923 comedy films
1923 short films
Films directed by Broncho Billy Anderson
Silent American comedy films
American comedy short films
1920s American films